Lena Häcki (born 1 July 1995) is a Swiss biathlete. She competed in the 2014/15 World Cup season, and represented Switzerland at the Biathlon World Championships 2015 in Kontiolahti.

References

External links 
 

1995 births
Living people
Swiss female biathletes
Olympic biathletes of Switzerland 
Biathletes at the 2018 Winter Olympics 
Biathletes at the 2022 Winter Olympics
People from Obwalden